Basketball at the Mediterranean Games has been played consistently since 1951 for men, and 1987 for women. The Yugoslavia national team was the most successful men's team, while the Croatia women's national team being the most successful in the women's competition. Since 2018, the Mediterranean Games has exclusively featured 3x3 basketball.

Men's tournaments

3x3 Basketball men's tournament

Men's medal table

Women's tournaments

3x3 Basketball women's tournament

Women's medal table

All-time medal table
Updated with 2022 results.

See also
Basketball at the Summer Olympics
Basketball at the Summer Universiade

References

External links
Hellenic Basketball Federation Men's Mediterranean Games medals table
Hellenic Basketball Federation Women's Mediterranean Games medals table

  
B
Mediterranean Games
Mediterranean Games
Mediterranean Games
Mediterranean Games
1951 introductions